"Hurts to Be in Love" is a song by Canadian singer/songwriter Gino Vannelli. Released as a single in 1985, the song was his seventh Top 40 hit in his native Canada, peaking at #19. In the U.S., the song reached #57 on the Billboard Hot 100 and #6 on the Adult Contemporary chart. It appears on his eighth album, Black Cars. The song was produced by the three brothers Gino, Joe, and Ross Vannelli, and written by Gino. It finished at #100 in the Canadian Year-end Chart.

Track listing
Canada 7" single
A. "Hurts to Be in Love" - 3:39
B. "Here She Comes" - 3:18

Credits 
 Gino Vannelli – lead vocals 
 Joe Vannelli – synthesizers 
 Mike Miller – guitars 
 Jimmy Haslip – bass guitar 
 Mark Craney – drums 
 Ross Vannelli – backing vocals

References

External links
 

1984 songs
1985 singles
Gino Vannelli songs
Songs written by Gino Vannelli
Polydor Records singles